Gypsou, sometimes also Gypsos (from Gypsum), is a village located in the Famagusta District of Cyprus, near the town of Lefkoniko. It is under the de facto control of Northern Cyprus.

The village got its name from a small hill about 1 mile to the north. From this hill the locals produced Plaster of Paris, commonly known as Gypsum hence the name Gypsos.

The village was connected to the electricity network early in 1959-60 and all village roads surfaced with asphalt in 1962.

This is a mainly small scale farming village with farmers producing wheat, barley, vegetables and fruit.

References

Communities in Famagusta District
Populated places in Gazimağusa District